Chepo is a district (distrito) of Panamá Province in Panama. The population according to the 2000 census was 32,195; the latest official estimate (for 2019) is 59,382. The district covers a total area of 4,937 km². The capital lies at the town of Chepo.

Administrative divisions
Chepo District is divided administratively into the following corregimientos:

San Cristóbal de Chepo (capital)
Cañita
Chepillo
El Llano
Las Margaritas
Santa Cruz de Chinina
Madungandí - a comarca indígena (indigenous territory)
Tortí

See also
 Chepo River

References

Districts of Panamá Province